Bohn Aluminum and Brass Corporation was a manufacturing company based in Detroit, Michigan and formed in 1924 from the merger of the General Aluminium and Brass Company and the C.B. Bohn Foundry Company. It produced a series of notable advertisements depicting applications of its product in futuristic environments. It merged into Universal American in 1963. Universal American merged into Gulf and Western Industries in 1966.

References

External sources

Imaging the Future, Arthur Radebaugh, Bohn Aluminium and Brass Corporation, advertisements
Creepy anti-communist propaganda from Bohn Aluminum and Brass Corporation, 1952

Manufacturing companies based in Detroit
Gulf and Western Industries